Taleporia is a genus of small moths. It belongs to the bagworm moth family (Psychidae). The "wastebin genus" Solenobia is technically a junior synonym of the present genus, but most of the species formerly placed there actually belong to other genera of subfamilies Taleporiinae and Naryciinae (which is sometimes included in the former).

Selected species

 Taleporia aethiopica
 Taleporia amariensis
 Taleporia anderegella
 Taleporia austriaca
 Taleporia autumnella Rebel, 1919
 Taleporia bavaralta
 Taleporia borealis Wocke, 1862
 Taleporia caucasica
 Taleporia clandestinella
 Taleporia crepusculella
 Taleporia discussa
 Taleporia glabrella
 Taleporia gozmanyi
 Taleporia gramatella
 Taleporia guenei
 Taleporia hirta
 Taleporia improvisella Staudinger, 1859
 Taleporia isozopha

 Taleporia lefebvriella
 Taleporia mesochlora
 Taleporia minor
 Taleporia minorella
 Taleporia nana
 Taleporia nigropterella
 Taleporia politella (Ochsenheimer, 1816)
 Taleporia pseudobombycella
 Taleporia pseudoimprovisella Witt & de Freina, 1984
 Taleporia sciacta
 Taleporia shosenkyoensis
 Taleporia szocsi
 Taleporia tesserella
 Taleporia triangularis
 Taleporia trichopterella
 Taleporia tubulosa
 Taleporia zopha

Footnotes

References
  (2009): Markku Savela's Lepidoptera and some other life forms – Taleporia. Version of 2009-JUL-07. Retrieved 2010-APR-10.

Psychidae
Psychidae genera